The 1957 Latin Cup was the eighth and final edition of the annual Latin Cup. It was contested by the domestic league champions the Southwest European nations of France, Italy, Portugal, and Spain. The clubs which competed in the tournament were AS Saint-Étienne, AC Milan, SL Benfica, and Real Madrid CF.

The four-match knockout tournament, was hosted in Madrid, Spain at the Santiago Bernabéu Stadium. In the semifinals on 20 June, SL Benfica defeated AS Saint-Étienne by a score of 1–0, and Real Madrid CF defeated AC Milan by a score of 5–1. The third place match was held on 23 June, where AC Milan defeated AS Saint-Étienne 4–3. The final, which was held on the same day, saw Real Madrid CF claim its second Latin Cup title in a 1–0 victory. A total of 15 goals were scored in the tournament, and Real Madrid's Francisco Gento was the top goalscorer with 3 goals, all of which were scored against AC Milan in the semifinals.

Real Madrid had won the 1956–57 European Cup less than one month before the 1957 Latin Cup and became one of only three teams, together with FC Barcelona and AC Milan, to win the Latin Cup on two occasions. Additionally, the country of Spain was awarded a trophy for its overall success in the prior four Latin Cups.

Participating teams 

The Latin Cup was an international club tournament which was contested by the domestic league champions of France, Italy, Portugal, and Spain. The tournament served as a regional championship for Southwestern Europe, similar to the Mitropa Cup for Central Europe and Balkans Cup for the Balkans, prior to the establishment of the European Cup. The following league champions qualified for the 1957 Latin Cup:

Venues 

The host of the tournament was Spain and all matches were played at the Santiago Bernabéu Stadium in Madrid.

Tournament

Semifinals 

Lots were drawn to determine the semifinal matches of the 1957 Latin Cup, and both semifinal matches were held on 20 June. The first match was Benfica versus Saint-Étienne. The match was refereed by Daniel Zariquiegui Izco of the Spanish Football Federation and resulted in a 1–0 victory for Benfica; Portuguese midfielder Francisco Calado scored the match's lone goal.

The second match was Real Madrid versus Milan. Not only were both clubs champions of their respective domestic leagues, but Milan was the Latin Cup's defending champion and Real Madrid had just won its second consecutive European Cup title in Madrid on 30 May 1957. The match refereed by Marcel Lequesne of the French Football Federation and resulted in a 5–1 victory for Real Madrid. Spanish forward Francisco Gento scored the tournament's only hat-trick during the match, scoring three goals.

Third place match 

Milan and Saint-Étienne faced each other in the third place match on 23 June. The match was refereed by Joaquim Fernandes de Campos of the Portuguese Football Federation. Saint-Étienne took an early lead with a 9th minute goal from François Wicart, however, consecutive goals from Milan in the 18th minute by Eduardo Ricagni, the 42nd minute by Amos Mariani, and the 70th minute by Nils Liedholm helped give Milan a 3–1 lead. Saint-Étienne responded with goals from Rachid Mekhloufi in the 78th minute and Eugène N'Jo Léa in the 80th minute to level the match at 3–3, but a goal from Nils Liedholm in the 88th minute allowed Milan to defeat Saint-Étienne by a final score of 4–3.

Final 

The final match was contested by Real Madrid and Benfica on 23 June 1957; Lequesne was the match's referee. Both clubs had previously won the tournament, as Benfica defeated FC Girondins de Bordeaux in 1950 and Real Madrid defeated Stade de Reims in 1955. During the final, Spanish forward Alfredo Di Stéfano scored the match's lone goal at the 50th minute for Real Madrid in a 1–0 victory. Additionally, Portuguese midfielder Zézinho received the only red card of the tournament during the match in the 54th minute. The 1957 Latin Cup was Real Madrid's second Latin Cup title, and Real Madrid was the Latin Cup's last ever champion.

Bracket

Statistics

Goalscorers 

A total of 15 goals were scored during the tournament: 6 by Real Madrid, 5 by Milan, 3 by Saint-Étienne, and 1 by Benfica. Gento was the tournament's top scorer, scoring 3 goals in a hat-trick against Milan in the semifinals. Di Stéfano scored the tournament's final goal—the lone goal in the final match against Benfica.

Aftermath 

The 1957 Latin Cup was the final edition of the tournament ever hosted. As happened in 1954, the 1958 edition of the tournament was canceled due to the conflicting schedule of the 1958 FIFA World Cup. Due to the rising popularity of the European Cup, however, the tournament was not hosted again. After the tournament, the four nations which participated in the 1953, 1955, 1956, and 1957 editions of the tournament were allocated points based on their clubs' performances. Spain, which won the 1955 and 1957 editions, was awarded a trophy for topping the other three nations in point totals.

See also 

 1957 Mitropa Cup, a similar competition

References

External links 

 Latin Cup (Full Results) (in English) from RSSSF
 Taça Latina 1957 (in Spanish) from ceroacero.es

Latin Cup
International association football competitions hosted by Spain
June 1957 sports events in Europe